Presbyterian Church at Bound Brook is a historic church at 409 Mountain Avenue in Bound Brook, Somerset County, New Jersey. The congregation was founded in the 18th century and is one of the oldest in New Jersey. The building was added to the National Register of Historic Places on August 28, 2007 for its significance in ecclesiastical architecture from 1896 to 1922.

History
The Reverend Israel Read was the first pastor to be called to minister to the congregation, serving between 1750 and 1793. Several temporary or "supply pastors" served the congregation before Read. The earliest recorded grave in the Old Presbyterian Graveyard at Bound Brook was dated 1744. Currently the oldest extent legible stone is dated 1760 marking the grave of Catherine Read, the infant daughter of Israel and Mary Read.

The current building was constructed in 1896 to the design of architect Oscar Teale who was also a magician who worked closely with Harry Houdini. The building has elements of both Tudor Revival and Gothic Revival architecture. Several Tiffany-designed stained glass windows grace the church.

Gallery

References

External links
 
 

Bound Brook, New Jersey
Presbyterian churches in New Jersey
Churches on the National Register of Historic Places in New Jersey
Churches completed in 1896
19th-century Presbyterian church buildings in the United States
Churches in Somerset County, New Jersey
National Register of Historic Places in Somerset County, New Jersey
New Jersey Register of Historic Places